Thalotia tiaraeides is a species of sea snail, a marine gastropod mollusk in the family Trochidae, the top snails.

Description
The height of an adult shell attains 6 mm.

Distribution
This marine species occurs off the Austral Islands and French Polynesia.

References

External links
 To World Register of Marine Species
 

tiaraeides
Gastropods described in 2012